Three-time defending champion Esther Vergeer defeated Sharon Walraven in the final, 6–0, 6–0 to win the women's singles wheelchair tennis title at the 2010 French Open. Vergeer lost no sets and only four games en route to the title.

Seeds
 Esther Vergeer (champion)
 Florence Gravellier (semifinals)

Draw

Finals

References
Main Draw

Wheelchair Women's Singles
French Open, 2010 Women's Singles